Schedl is a German surname. Notable people with the surname include: 

 Gerhard Schedl (1957−2000), an Austrian composer
 Karl E. Schedl (1898–1979), an Austrian entomologist, specialist on Coleoptera
 Klaus Schedl (born 1966), a German composer
 Paul Schedl (born 1947), an American Professor of Molecular Biology at Princeton University
 Timothy Schedl (born 1955), an American professor of genetics at Washington University in St. Louis

German-language surnames